The Manly Substation is a heritage-listed electrical substation located at 34a-36 Whistler Street, Manly, Northern Beaches Council, New South Wales, Australia. It was built in 1945. It is also known as #15009 Manly 33Kv Zone/Residential Unit. The property is owned by Ausgrid, a privately owned energy utility company. The substation was added to the New South Wales State Heritage Register on 2 April 1999.

History 
The Manly Zone substation is a purpose designed and built structure constructed . "MANLY ZONE SUBSTATION" appears on the façade in metal lettering. The "RESEDENTIAL UNIT" no 34a is located within the same building. Its property number is 7007.
Historical period: 1926-1950.

Description 
The Manly Zone substation is a fine and robust, well detailed face brick two storey building built on the street alignment. Stylistic elements of Inter-war Art Deco include the extensive use of face brick and brick detailing in the stepped parapet and base of the projecting first floor oriel windows and the use of bold linear motifs. Decorative elements include the use of curved bricks to form unusual framing around windows and doorways. The building incorporates a resedential unit titled #15101 RESEDENTIAL UNIT, 34a Whistler Street. The Manly Zone substation is constructed in load-bearing face brick with cement render applied to the plant doorway reveals. Original windows are double hung timber multi pane. Exterior materials used include face brick, timber joinery, and steel roller shutter.

Condition 
As at 8 November 2000, the condition of the substation was good.

Modifications and dates 
Aluminium windows and doors installed at ground level.

Heritage listing 
As at 8 November 2000, the Manly Zone substation was a fine and robust, well detailed face brick purpose designed and built structure. It is an excellent and externally intact representative example of the Interwar Art Deco style. It is considered to be a rare example of this style and of State Significance.

Substation was listed on the New South Wales State Heritage Register on 2 April 1999.

See also 

 Australian non-residential architectural styles

References

Attribution 

New South Wales State Heritage Register
Manly, New South Wales
Electric power infrastructure in New South Wales
Articles incorporating text from the New South Wales State Heritage Register
1945 establishments in Australia
Energy infrastructure completed in 1945
Buildings and structures in Sydney